was the third of five main administrative districts of the pre-war Imperial Japanese Navy. Its territory included the western and southern coastline of Kyūshū, the Ryukyu Islands, Taiwan and Korea, as well as patrols in the East China Sea and the Pacific

Sasebo also contained the Sasebo Naval Arsenal, specializing mostly in destroyers and smaller warships; and its anchorage was one of the largest in Japan. The District encompassed anchorages at Imari and Hirado ports as well as the designated third echelon naval ports  of Takeshiki (Tsushima), Kagoshima, Kuji (Amami-Ōshima), and Wakamatsu (Gotō Islands)

History
The location of Sasebo  facing China and Korea, and near the foreign treaty port of Nagasaki was recognized of strategic importance by the leaders of the early Meiji government and early Imperial Japanese Navy. In 1883, the then Lieutenant Commander Tōgō Heihachirō nominated what was a tiny fishing village as the ideal location for a naval base. With the formation of the navy in 1886, Japan was divided into five  each with a headquarters . Sasebo was designated as the "Third Naval District" (第三海軍区, dai-san kaigunku), and its harbor was dredged, a breakwater constructed and docking, coaling and repair facilities for warships were established, and the military base was officially opened in 1889. To stress the importance of the base, Emperor Meiji made a personal inspection tour in 1890.

The base was connected to the rest of Japan by rail in 1898, and the Sasebo Naval Arsenal, which would eventually expand to become one of the largest shipyards in Japan for the construction of smaller warships, began operation in 1903. As with the other Naval Districts, Sasebo was intended to operate as independently as possible, and facilities included armories, production factories for torpedoes, naval mines and naval artillery (and associated ammunition), and also a naval hospital and training centers. In concept, the Naval District was similar to the United States Navy Sea Frontiers concept. the Naval District maintained a small garrison force of ships and Naval Land Forces which reported directly to the Guard District commander, and hosted detachments of the numbered fleets on a temporary assignment basis.

Sasebo was the closest ship repair facility for the Imperial Japanese Navy to the combat zones of the Russo-Japanese War and saw considerable activity during that conflict.

In 1920, the Japanese navy established an air wing and a wireless communications center in 1922. In 1934, the Tomozuru capsized off Sasebo with loss of most of its crew, and leaving behind serious questions about the basic design of many Japanese warships.

In 1941, base facilities were expanded considerably for the Pacific War. The base also hosted a major portion of the Japanese Special Naval Landing Forces. The Imperial Japanese Navy had some 60,000 people working in the dock yard and associated naval stations at the peak of World War II, outfitting ships, submarines and aircraft.

Most of the base was destroyed by American air raids on Japan on June 28, 1945. After the surrender of Japan, Sasebo was occupied by the U.S. Marine Corps' Fifth Division, and the Sasebo Naval District was formally abolished on November 30, 1945.

Part of the former base facilities is still in use by the United States Navy as the United States Fleet Activities Sasebo and by the Japan Maritime Self-Defense Force. One of the former base structures is now a museum.

Order of Battle at time of the attack on Pearl Harbor
 Third Naval District (Admiral Tanimoto)
AO Sata
Sasebo Naval Base
Base HQ
Communications
Supply
Accounting
Construction
Ports & Docks
Navy Yard
Navy Hospital
Navy Prison
Naval Fuel Depot
Base Garrison
Special Naval Landing Forces
Sasebo Submarine Base
Sasebo Air Group
16x Mitsubishi A5M Claude
6 x Aichi E13A Jake
15 x Kawanishi H6K Mavis
Sasebo Guard Force
Sasebo Coastal Defense Squadron
PM Kozan Maru
 Sasebo Local Defense Squadron
PG Shinkyo Maru (2672 tons)
 PG Shinkyo Maru #5
 Minesweeper Division 42
 AMc Seki Maru (297 tons)
 AMc Toshi Maru #7 (297 tons)
Oshima Guard Force (based at Naze, Oshima Island)
AMc Chuon Maru #8
AMc Hakata Maru #7 (257 tons)
AMc Himejima Maru
Minesweeper Division 41
AMc Kyo Maru #1
AMc Kyo Maru #3
AMc Kyo Maru #5

List of commanders

Commanding officers

Chief of Staff
Captain Tameo Nakamizo (April 25, 1889 –  May 15, 1890)
Rear-Admiral Koreyoshi Ogata (May 15, 1890 –  February 18, 1891)
Rear-Admiral Masanaga Matsumura (February 18, 1891 –  July 23, 1891)
Rear-Admiral Tadashi Nomura (July 23, 1891 –  May 20, 1893)
Vice-Admiral Nagataka Uemura (May 20, 1893 –  December 5, 1894)
Vice-Admiral Tomomichi Onomoto (December 5, 1894 –  December 27, 1897)
Vice-Admiral Yoshitomo Inoue (December 27, 1897 –  May 23, 1898)
Captain Masaki Hashimoto (May 23, 1898 –  March 22, 1899)
Rear-Admiral Ichiro Nijima (March 22, 1899 –  June 19, 1900)
Rear-Admiral Tasuku Serata (June 19, 1900 – July 4, 1900)
Admiral Motaro Yoshimatsu (July 4, 1900 – July 6, 1901)
Vice-Admiral Hikohachi Yamada (July 6, 1901 – October 19, 1903)
Rear-Admiral Shinjiro Uehara (November 21, 1903 – June 6, 1904)
Vice-Admiral Baron Toshiatsu Sakamoto (June 6, 1904 – November 2, 1905)
Admiral Motaro Yoshimatsu (November 2, 1905 – February 2, 1906)
Rear-Admiral Ichiro Nijima (February 2, 1906 – April 7, 1906)
Vice-Admiral Koshi Saito (April 7, 1906 – October 21, 1907)
Rear-Admiral Genzaburo Ogi (October 21, 1907 – May 15, 1908)
Vice-Admiral Baron Shinrokuro Nishi (May 15, 1908 – May 26, 1908)
Vice-Admiral Tamotsu Tsuchiya (May 26, 1908 – December 10, 1908)
Admiral Baron Gentaro Yamashita (December 10, 1908 – March 4, 1909)
Rear-Admiral Genzaburo Ogi (March 4, 1909 – December 1, 1909)
Vice-Admiral Yasutaro Egashira (December 1, 1909 – March 11, 1911)
Admiral Kaneo Nomaguchi (March 11, 1911 – September 21, 1911)
Vice-Admiral Rinroku Eguchi (September 21, 1911 – April 20, 1912)
Vice-Admiral Otojiro Ito (April 20, 1912 – December 1, 1913)
Rear-Admiral Ichitaro Nakajima (December 1, 1913 – March 25, 1914)
Vice-Admiral Tomojiro Chisaka (March 25, 1914 – December 1, 1914)
Vice-Admiral Hiromi Tadakoro (December 1, 1914 – December 1, 1916)
Vice-Admiral Hanroku Saito (December 1, 1916 – December 1, 1917)
Vice-Admiral Nobutaro Shimomura (December 1, 1917 – November 10, 1918)
Admiral Saburo Hyakutake (November 10, 1918 – December 1, 1919)
Vice-Admiral Kenzo Kobayashi (December 1, 1919 – May 1, 1922)
Rear-Admiral Kametaro Muta (May 1, 1922 – December 1, 1923)
Vice-Admiral Shiro Furukawa (December 1, 1923 – December 1, 1925)
Vice-Admiral Yukichi Shima (December 1, 1925 – December 1, 1927)
Vice-Admiral Togo Kawano (December 1, 1927 – December 10, 1928)
Vice-Admiral Akira Fujiyoshi (December 10, 1928 – December 1, 1930)
Vice-Admiral Giichiro Kawamura (December 1, 1930 – December 1, 1931)
Vice-Admiral Yoshiyuki Niiyama (December 1, 1931 – November 15, 1933)
Vice-Admiral Eikichi Katagiri (November 15, 1933 – November 15, 1934)
Rear-Admiral Hiroyoshi Tabata (November 15, 1934 – March 1, 1935)
Vice-Admiral Ibō Takahashi (March 1, 1935 – October 31, 1935)
Vice-Admiral Mitsumi Shimizu (October 31, 1935 – November 16, 1936)
Vice-Admiral Hidesaburo Koori (November 16, 1936 – September 1, 1938)
Vice-Admiral Masami Kobayashi (September 1, 1938 – November 15, 1939)
Vice-Admiral Kakuji Kakuta (November 15, 1939 – October 15, 1940)
Vice-Admiral Shigenori Horiuchi (October 15, 1940 – October 10, 1941)
Vice-Admiral Gisaburo Yamaguchi (October 10, 1941 – December 2, 1942)
Vice-Admiral Masaki Ogata (December 2, 1942 – November 15, 1943)
Vice-Admiral Shigeji Kaneko (November 15, 1943 – January 29, 1945)
Rear-Admiral Keishi Ishii (January 29, 1945 – November 30, 1945)

References

Order of Battle at start of Pacific War

Imperial Japanese Navy
Japan Maritime Self-Defense Force bases